Joseph Nicolas Antonio Del Negro (1929–2015), known professionally as Del Negro, was an American–Spanish film actor and painter. He played Brother Gaspar de Carvajal in Werner Herzog's Aguirre, the Wrath of God.

Filmography
Joy House (1964) as Mick (credited as Negro)
Is Paris Burning? (1966) as Officer with Chaban-Delmas
Mission to Tokyo (1966)
The Enemies (De vijanden, 1968) as Mike (American soldier)
Money-Money (1969) as Ralph Johnson
Vampira (1971, TV Movie) as Schwarzer Magier
Aguirre, the Wrath of God (1972) as Gaspar de Carvajal
Pan (1973)
Sylvie (1973, TV Movie)
Who? (1974) as FBI Agent
Inki (1974)
Depression (1975, TV Movie)
Mansion of the Doomed (1976) as Black Intern
Summer Night Fever (1978) (credited as Joseph N. Delnegro) 
Barcelona South (1981) (final film role)

External links
 

American male film actors
1929 births
2015 deaths